Tampines MRT station is a Mass Rapid Transit (MRT) interchange station on the East West (EWL) and Downtown (DTL) lines in Tampines, Singapore. Situated at the heart of the Tampines town centre next to Tampines Avenue 4, Tampines Central 4 and Tampines Central 5, it is in close proximity to the Tampines and Tampines Concourse bus interchanges. The station also serves the surrounding retail developments of Tampines Mall, Tampines One and Century Square.

The EWL station opened on 16 December 1989 as part of the MRT eastern line extension to Pasir Ris station via this station. On 20 August 2010, it was announced that the station would interchange with the DTL by 2017. The DTL station, which isn't directly connected to the existing EWL station, was completed on 21 October 2017. The EWL station exterior has the characteristic dome-shaped segmented roof also seen on other elevated EWL stations, while the DTL station features  The Big Round & The Tall Long, an art piece by Studio Juju, as part of the MRT network's Art-in-Transit programme.

History

East West line (EWL)

In the planning stages of the MRT network, there were two proposed stations, tentatively named "Tampines North" and "Tampines South", on the EWL, with Tampines North being its eastern terminus. The station was later constructed as part of the section between Pasir Ris station and Tanah Merah station, which in turn was part of Phase 2A of the MRT system. The contract also included the construction of the Pasir Ris and Simei stations.

The station opened on 16 December 1989 when the EWL extends to Pasir Ris as announced by then-first deputy prime minister Goh Chok Tong on 4 November that year. The opening of the station was generally welcomed by residents in Tampines and Pasir Ris, who hoped for shorter travelling times to their workplaces in the city via the MRT.

Tampines station was one of the first five MRT stations to be retrofitted with lifts and ramps in 2002, alongside enhancement works such as toilets for the disabled. These works, which cost , were part of a system-wide programme to make the MRT network more wheel-chair accessible. The programme comes after lobbying by the Handicaps Welfare Association. In 2009, enhanced bicycle parking facilities were installed at Tampines station (alongside Yishun and Pasir Ris) as part of a pilot programme. These improvements include greater flexibility to lock the bicycles at either the frame or the wheels and basic shelters. The contract for the bicycle parking facilities was awarded to Shincon Industrial Pte Ltd at a contract sum of S$1.43 million (US$ million).

In 2012, half-height platform screen doors were installed at this station as part of the Land Transport Authority's (LTA) programme to improve safety in MRT stations. Later, on 30 March 2012, Tampines was the first MRT station to have high-volume low-speed fans installed above the station platforms as part of a network-wide programme to improve ventaliation at the platforms of elevated stations.

Downtown line (DTL)

On 20 August 2010, the LTA announced that Tampines station would be an interchange with the Downtown line. The station would be constructed as part of the  Stage 3, consisting of 16 stations between the River Valley (now Fort Canning) and Expo stations. The line was expected to be completed in 2017.

Contract 925A for the construction of the DTL station was awarded to KTC Civil Engineering & Construction Pte Ltd at a contract sum of S$118.5 million (US$ million) in July 2011. Construction of the station started that month and was targeted to complete in 2017.

The station was constructed using the top-down method. This was to minimise movement to the existing viaducts for the EWL. As there is limited space, special low headroom machines were utilised to facilitate some of the works. To prevent disruption to the operations of the bus interchange and the shops, a paid link was not constructed between the DTL and EWL stations.
 
On 31 May 2017, it was announced that the station, together with the rest of DTL3, would be opened on 21 October that year. Passengers were offered a preview of the station along with the other DTL3 stations at the DTL 3 Open House on 15 October.

Station details

Location
As the name suggests, the station serves the town of Tampines. The station is surrounded by the retail developments of Century Square, Tampines Mall and Tampines 1, in addition to commercial buildings such as the HDB (Housing and Development Board) Branch Office, AIA Tampines, the CPF (Central Provident Fund) Tampines Building and two Income buildings. It is also within walking distances to the Tampines North Community Club, Tampines Polyclinic, Our Tampines Hub and the Masjid Darul Ghufran.

The station also serves two bus interchanges: the Tampines Bus Interchange and the Tampines Concourse Bus Interchange. The latter bus interchange, which opened on 18 December 2016,  was built as an extension of the existing bus interchange.

Services
The station is an interchange between the EWL and the DTL. The official station code is EW2/DT32. On the EWL, the station is between the Pasir Ris and Simei stations. The EWL station operates between 5:22am and 11:39am and has headways of 2 to 5 minutes depending on peak hours.

On the DTL, the station is between the Tampines West and Tampines East stations. The DTL station operates between 5:41am and 12:35am and has headways of 2 to 5 minutes depending on peak hours. The DTL station is not directly connected to the EWL station and hence commuters have to exit either of the stations to transfer to the other line via a  sheltered walkway. The transfer is considered a "valid transfer" of a "journey" as long as it does not exceed 15 minutes.

Design

Like most EWL elevated stations on the eastern segment on the line, Tampines station has the notable feature of the dome-shaped roof, segmented like a caterpillar, over the platform level. The design was an attempt by the MRT Corporation (MRTC) to give the stations on the EWL an "attractive look". The colour scheme used for the station is rustic brown, reflected on the doors to the restricted areas and the ceiling trunking box at the platform level of the station.

The DTL station, designed by Greenhilli, is intended to "people-centric" while built at an affordable cost. It is designed to facilitate movement through interconnectivity, spatial volume, asymmetry, colour and "super-graphics". The spacious interior improves visual awareness within the station, fostering "intuitive" wayfinding and giving the station identity that reflects the locality of the area. The architecture of the DTL station allows future integration with upcoming developments, including provisions for additional underground developments above the station structure.

Public artwork
As part of the MRT system's Art-in-Transit Programme, The Big Round & The Tall Long by Studio Juju is an artwork consisting of two huge shapes – the Big Round and the Tall Long – on the opposite walls of the DTL platforms.

Both of these shapes reflect the dimensions of the station and "gave polarities" to the nearly symmetrical station, bringing a sense of "calm and order" to the station atmosphere. The shapes was also meant to "fill the void" between the vastness of space and commuters. These shapes, enhanced by the reflecting benches on the platforms, act as wayfinders for passengers travelling around the station.

Notes and references

Notes

References

External links

 

Railway stations in Singapore opened in 1989
Tampines
Mass Rapid Transit (Singapore) stations